Buchlyvie railway station served the village of Buchlyvie, Stirling, Scotland, from 1856 to 1959 on the Forth and Clyde Junction Railway.

History 
The station was opened on 26 May 1856 by the Forth and Clyde Junction Railway. On the westbound platform was the station building and on the south side was the goods yard. The station initially had one platform but a second one was built in 1892 as well as a signal box and a loop. The signal box was closed and replaced with a new one in 1895 when the loop was reduced to a single track. The station closed to passengers on 1 October 1951 and the signal box closed in 1956. The station closed to goods on 5 October 1959.

References 

Disused railway stations in Stirlingshire
Railway stations in Great Britain opened in 1856
Railway stations in Great Britain closed in 1951
1856 establishments in Scotland
1959 disestablishments in Scotland